Gymnastics events have been staged at the Olympic Games since 1896 with Russian female gymnasts having participated in every Olympic Games since 1996. A total of 32 female artistic gymnasts have represented Russia or the Russian Olympic Committee and they have won 27 medals, including a team gold in 2020.  As a team Russia has won one gold, three silvers, and one bronze.

The most decorated Russian females artistic gymnasts are Svetlana Khorkina (1996, 2000, 2004) and Aliya Mustafina (2012, 2016) with seven Olympic medals each.  Mustafina was the first Russian gymnast to defend two medals at consecutive games: she won bronze in all-around and gold on uneven bars in 2012 as well as the 2016 Summer Olympics.

Gymnasts

Summer Olympics 
The following only counts medals won by gymnasts when they represented Russia or the Russian Olympic Committee (Not the Unified Team or the Soviet Union). Example: Rozalia Galiyeva won a gold medal with the Unified Team in 1992, but only the silver medal she won in 1996 appears here.

Youth Olympic Games

Medalists

See also 

 List of Olympic female gymnasts for the Soviet Union
 List of Olympic male artistic gymnasts for Russia

References 

Russia
gymnasts
Olympic